Paul Moriarty may refer to:

 Paul D. Moriarty (born 1956), American politician from New Jersey
 Paul X. F. Moriarty, American politician from Massachusetts
 Paul Moriarty (rugby) (born 1964), Welsh rugby union and rugby league footballer
 Paul Moriarty (actor) (born 1946), British actor